Eyesore may refer to:

Eyesore, an unpleasant view
Eyesore, eye lesion, such as corneal ulcer
 “Eye Sore”, an episode of Hi Hi Puffy AmiYumi
Eyesore (EP), by Skinlab
"Eyesore" (song), by Janus